Nebria tatrica tatrica is a subspecies of ground beetle in the Nebriinae subfamily that can be found in Poland, Slovenia, and Slovakia.

References

tatrica tatrica
Beetles described in 1859
Beetles of Europe